Złodzieje zapalniczek – Pidzama Porno's fourth studio album, released in 1997 by S.P. Records. The material was recorded in Studio CZAD in Swarzedz. In 2007 the material was re-recorded and reissued again in "Zlodzieje zapalniczek - reedycja".

Track listing

Videos
"Ezoteryczny Poznań"
"Bal u senatora '93"

Personnel
Krzysztof "Grabaż" Grabowski – vocal
Andrzej "Kozak" Kozakiewicz – guitar, vocal
Sławek "Dziadek" Mizerkiewicz – guitar, chords
Rafał "Kuzyn" Piotrowiak – drums
Jacek Kąkolewski – bas guitar

and also:

Witek Niedziejko – saxophone
Tom "Wailer" Restis – trumpet
Jah Jah – vocal
Mikołaj Wojtaszewski – special effects

References 

Pidżama Porno albums
1997 albums